Jeffrey L. Coleman (born 1963) is an American politician. He is a member of the Missouri House of Representatives from the 32nd District, serving since 2019. He is a member of the Republican party.

Electoral History 
 Jeff Coleman has not yet had any opponents in the Republican primaries he has entered, thus getting nominated by default each time.

References

Living people
Republican Party members of the Missouri House of Representatives
Politicians from Independence, Missouri
1963 births
21st-century American politicians